Ségreville is a commune in the Haute-Garonne department in southwestern France.

Geography

Climate

Ségreville has a oceanic climate (Köppen climate classification Cfb) closely bordering on a humid subtropical climate (Cfa).

Population

See also
Communes of the Haute-Garonne department

References

Communes of Haute-Garonne